The Digital Group was the first company to produce a system built around the Zilog Z80 processor.  Their hobbyist-targeted products were based on a system of interchangeable boards and components which allowed users to upgrade to different CPUs without having to replace their peripherals. Their products included the MOS 6502 and Motorola 6800 processors.  They were established circa 1975 and went into bankruptcy liquidation in late 1979.

Peripherals included an inexpensive printer and a very unusual quad phi-deck cassette tape system for storing programs and data.

The company was notorious for its unreliability in delivering ordered products. They were shipped to customers not as systems from inventory but one board or peripheral at a time, meaning one could wait a while from receipt of the first component to having received enough components to build a working system.

In 1978 or 1979, they finally had cases (very well-designed and professional looking for the time period) that reportedly were even harder to get than the rest of the components.

External links 
Examples of Digital Group equipment.
History of The Digital Group.
DigiBarn Systems pictures of The Digital Group Systems, including a scan of bankruptcy auction notice

American companies established in 1975
American companies disestablished in 1979
Companies based in Denver
Computer companies established in 1975
Computer companies disestablished in 1979
Defunct computer companies of the United States